Ivan Borisov (born 4 March 1979) is a Kyrgyzstani former alpine skier. He competed in two events at the 2006 Winter Olympics.

References

External links
 

1979 births
Living people
Kyrgyzstani male alpine skiers
Olympic alpine skiers of Kyrgyzstan
Alpine skiers at the 2006 Winter Olympics
Sportspeople from Bishkek
Alpine skiers at the 2007 Asian Winter Games